Mineola is a village in and the county seat of Nassau County, on Long Island, in New York, United States. The population was 18,799 at the 2010 census. The name is derived from an Algonquin Chief, Miniolagamika, which means "pleasant village".

The Incorporated Village of Mineola is located primarily in the Town of North Hempstead, with the exception being a small portion of its southern edge within the Town of Hempstead. Old Country Road runs along the village's southern border. The area serviced by the Mineola Post Office extends farther south into the adjacent village of Garden City, where the Old Nassau County Courthouse is located. Offices of many Nassau County agencies are in both Mineola and Garden City.

History 
The central, flat, grassy part of Long Island was originally  known as the Hempstead Plains. In the 19th century, various communities were started in this area. One of those communities was called "Hempstead Branch," which would ultimately be known as "Mineola" later on.

Long Island was part of Henry Hudson's original claim in the name of the Dutch East India Company dating as far back as 1609. In the 18th century, the Dutch and English settlers worked to clear farmland to start their life on the Hempstead Plains. It was in 1858 when this land was named after an Algonquin Indian Chief, Miniolagamika meaning, "Pleasant Village". The name was later shortened and altered to "Mineola".

From about 1787 until the 1870s, the area was the county seat for Queens County, in a section then known as Clowesville, just outside the present village boundaries. The western portion of Queens became a borough of New York City in 1898, and in 1899 Nassau County was formed from the part of Queens that did not so consolidate. 
Voters selected Mineola (in the Town of North Hempstead) to be the county seat for the new county of Nassau in November 1898
(before Mineola incorporated as a village in 1906 and set its boundaries), winning out over Hicksville and Hempstead. The Garden City Company (founded in 1893 by the heirs of Alexander Turney Stewart) donated four acres of land for the county buildings just south of the Mineola train station and the present day Village of Mineola, in the Town of Hempstead.

Mineola officially became the County Seat of Nassau County on July 13, 1900, as Governor Theodore Roosevelt laid the cornerstone of the Nassau County Court House. A celebration was held to commemorate the occasion on the barren  site at the corner of Old Country Road and Franklin Avenue. Many dignitaries were present to witness this event such as Frederick Hicks, Congressman Townsend Scudder, Colonel William Youngs and Supervisors William Jones and Edwin Willits.

Mineola was legally incorporated as a village in 1906 and run by a president. The land on which the County buildings sat was not included as part of the village. The land and the buildings have a Mineola postal address, but are within the present day Village of Garden City, which did not incorporate or set its boundaries until 1919.

NYU Langone Hospital - Long Island, founded in 1896 by local physicians and residents as Nassau Hospital, and later Winthrop-University Hospital, was Long Island's first voluntary hospital. In 1897, it admitted 91 patients, performed 27 operations, and reported two births and eight deaths during the first year. The original hospital was constructed in 1900. Renamed Winthrop in the 1980s, it is now a nationally recognized award-winning hospital and in 2004 was ranked among the Top 5 Percent of Acute-Care Hospitals in the Country.

In 1888, the Mineola Fire Department was formed in the Willis Ave School house. The department soon moved to a location on Washington Ave.

Mineola was also a familiar place to many of the most famous pilots in history. The Aero Club of America chose the area for the level plains. Glenn Curtiss brought the area to national attention in July 1909 with his second Scientific American Award flight of over 23 minutes and 15 miles. He also made some of the first public flights in America in his "Golden Flyer", while practicing for the Reims Aviation Meet in France. The Wright Brothers, Igor Sikorsky, Captain Rene Fonck, and the famed duo of Clarence Chamberlain and Bert Acosta, dubbed "twins of derring-do", all spent time in Mineola taking advantage of the rolling grasslands and favorable winds.

On November 1, 1915, Captain Raynal Cawthorne Bolling—a prominent New York attorney working at United States Steel—organized the Aviation Detachment, 1st Battalion Signal Corps of the New York National Guard (now the 102d Rescue Squadron). It was the Guard's first genuine aviation unit. Subsequently, the organization was redesignated the 1st Aero Company. Located at Mineola on Long Island, the unit rented and then purchased its own aircraft with funds donated by the Aero Club of America and other contributors. It was "provisionally recognized" on June 22, 1916, and then called into federal service on July 13, 1916, during the Mexican border crisis. However, instead of active service in the southwest, it remained at Mineola training and was released from federal service on November 2, 1916.

After World War I, the British Royal Navy rigid airship R34 made the first-ever east-west aerial crossing of the North Atlantic, traveling from the airship base at RAF East Fortune in the UK to Mineola from July 2 to July 6, 1919.<ref>The Transatlantic Voyage of R.34 [[Flight International|Flight]] 10 July 1919, pp. 906–10</ref>

On May 20, 1927, at 7:52 a.m., Charles Lindbergh started his historic flight from nearby Roosevelt Field.  Thirty-three hours later he landed in Paris and became the first person to complete a solo flight from the United States across the Atlantic Ocean.

The Mineola Hotel burned down in 1966 as the result of arson. One man was killed.

Main Street was the center of village business as well as a popular meeting place for farmers and the business community alike. The general store offered an array of goods that would fulfill most everyday needs, such as hardware, toys, wool, dry goods, clothing and food. The small glass-fronted mail and delivery boxes filled the existing six-foot post office. As the Mineola population grew, the post office was relocated to the Meyer Building on Mineola Boulevard and then twice more to 3rd Street and 2nd Street. It eventually found its permanent home on 1st Street and Main Street.

Mineola's first theatre named Allen's Hall drew in many early moviegoers to see "the flickers". Motion picture success drew in other theaters to the area, the most lavish being the Century Opera House. Most theaters had a showing in the morning and in the evening, usually featuring a live pianist who kept up with the action of the movie while playing music that suited the story.

As years passed, Jericho Turnpike became the commercial "main street". Farmland was sold off and homes and offices were built. Mineola has continued to be a community of growth and development.

Mineola held its centennial celebration in 2006.

Mineola is home to large Portuguese communities, and has been for years. Portuguese restaurants and businesses and the Portuguese language are a common feature throughout the neighborhood.

Geography

The villages bordering Mineola are Garden City, Old Westbury, East Williston, and Williston Park. Mineola also borders the hamlets (CDP) of Carle Place, Garden City Park, Herricks, and Roslyn Heights.

The village gained territory between the 1990 census and the 2000 census.

Near the center of the village, Mineola Memorial Park commemorates the victims of the September 11 terrorist attacks with a monument. Mineola's own Memorial Library and private and public schools adjoin the park. The Memorial Tablet and surrounding paths were an Eagle Project by Troop 45 Eagle Scout Edward Kaiser.

Climate

Demographics

2010 census

As of the census of 2010, there were 18,799 people, 7,473 households, and 4,954 families residing in the village. The population density was 10,337.3 people per square mile (3,992.6/km2). There were 7,650 housing units at an average density of 4,111.5 per square mile (1,588.0/km2). The racial makeup of the village was 81.7% White, 71.5% Non-Hispanic White, 2.0% African American, 0.2% Native American, 8.5% Asian, 0.0% Pacific Islander, 5.3% from other races, and 2.3% from two or more races. 16.4% of the population is Hispanic or Latino of any race.

There were 7,473 households, out of which 27.0% had children under the age of 18 living with them, 53.2% were married couples living together, 9.3% had a female householder with no husband present, and 33.7% were non-families. 29.1% of all households were made up of individuals, and 11.8% had someone living alone who was 65 years of age or older. The average household size was 2.57 and the average family size was 3.20.

In the village, the population was spread out, with 20.2% under the age of 18, 7.4% from 18 to 24, 34.1% from 25 to 44, 22.6% from 45 to 64, and 15.7% who were 65 years of age or older. The median age was 38 years. For every 100 females, there were 92.5 males. For every 100 females age 18 and over, there were 89.6 males.

The median income for a household in the village was $60,706, and the median income for a family was $71,042. Males had a median income of $47,182 versus $37,057 for females. The per capita income for the village was $28,890. About 2.6% of families and 4.2% of the population were below the poverty line, including 3.5% of those under age 18 and 5.4% of those age 65 or over.

2000 census

As of the census of 2000, there were 19,234 people, 7,473 households, and 4,954 families residing in the village. The population density was 10,337.3 people per square mile (3,992.6/km2). There were 7,650 housing units at an average density of 4,111.5/sq mi (1,588.0/km2). The racial makeup of the village was 82.39% White, 1.03% African American, 0.29% Native American, 4.52% Asian, 0.04% Pacific Islander, 3.93% from other races, and 3.79% from two or more races. 13.03% of the population is Hispanic or Latino of any race.

There were 7,473 households, out of which 27.0% had children under the age of 18 living with them, 53.2% were married couples living together, 9.3% had a female householder with no husband present, and 33.7% were non-families. 29.1% of all households were made up of individuals, and 11.8% had someone living alone who was 65 years of age or older. The average household size was 2.57 and the average family size was 3.20.

In the village, the population was spread out, with 20.2% under the age of 18, 7.4% from 18 to 24, 34.1% from 25 to 44, 22.6% from 45 to 64, and 15.7% who were 65 years of age or older. The median age was 38 years. For every 100 females, there were 92.5 males. For every 100 females age 18 and over, there were 89.6 males.

The median income for a household in the village was $60,706, and the median income for a family was $71,042. Males had a median income of $47,182 versus $37,057 for females. The per capita income for the village was $28,890. About 2.6% of families and 4.2% of the population were below the poverty line, including 3.5% of those under age 18 and 5.4% of those age 65 or over.

Government
The legislative body of the village, the Village of Mineola Board of Trustees, is composed of a mayor and four trustees. Each member is elected to a four-year term. The board is charged with management of village property and finances, and may take all measures under the law for the good government of the village. The trustees may adopt a wide range of local laws to address village concerns.

They are appointed to be liaison officers to various community organizations throughout the village and report back to the board with updates at board meetings.

As of July 2022, the Mayor of Mineola is Paul A. Pereira, the Deputy Mayor is Janine Sartori, and the Village Trustees are Jeffrey M. Clark, Paul S. Cuasto, Janine Sartori, and Donna M. Solosky.

Police force
In 2005–2006, as a result of numerous recommendations from the community that Mineola increase its police force, a Mineola Police Task Force was appointed by Mayor Jack M. Martins to evaluate the feasibility of withdrawing from the Nassau County Police Department and establishing a village police force. The Mayor indicated to the Task Force at its inception that if the feasibility study resulted in a positive report, Mineola would only have its own police department if the residents approved such through a village-wide referendum.

The village board was split 3–2 in favor of the police force, with then-Mayor Jack Martins, Deputy Mayor Werther and Trustee Davanzo supporting it while trustees Fargrieve and Cusato opposed it. On December 5, 2006 the measure was defeated by a 2-1 margin.

 Economy 
Dover Publications is based in Mineola.

 Education 

 Public 

Mineola is primarily located within the boundaries of (and served by) the Mineola Union Free School District. Smaller sections of Mineola are in the East Williston UFSD, Carle Place UFSD, and the Garden City UFSD. As such, children who reside within the village and attend public schools go to school in one of these four districts, depending on where they live within the village.

 Private 
The private Chaminade High School is located within the village.

 Infrastructure 

 Transportation 

 Road 
Jericho Turnpike (NY 25) passes through the village and Hillside Avenue (NY 25B) forms part of its northern border. Old Country Road also passes through the village and forms its border with Garden City.

The historic Long Island Motor Parkway used to pass through the village, as well.

Other major roads within the village include Mineola Boulevard, Roslyn Road, and Willis Avenue.

 Rail 
The Mineola station on the Long Island Rail Road's Main Line is located within the village. It serves trains on the Oyster Bay, Ronkonkoma, and Port Jefferson Branches, as well as limited service on the Montauk Branch.

 Bus 

Mineola's Mineola Intermodal Center contains the Long Island Rail Road station and a Nassau Inter-County Express (NICE) bus station; the Mineola Intermodal Center is one of Nassau County's main bus hubs. 
Mineola is served by the following routes:
 n22: Jamaica - Hicksville via Hillside Avenue & Prospect Avenue
 n22X: Jamaica - Hicksville via Hillside Avenue & Prospect Avenue
 n23: Mineola - Manorhaven
 n24: Jamaica - Hicksville via Jericho Turnpike & Old Country Road
 n40/41: Mineola - Freeport

The n27 also serves Mineola, but does not stop at the Mineola Intermodal Center.

 Utilities 

 Natural gas 
National Grid USA provides natural gas to homes and businesses that are hooked up to natural gas lines in Mineola.

 Power 
PSEG Long Island provides power to all homes and businesses within Mineola.

 Sewage 
Mineola is connected to sanitary sewers. The village maintains a sanitary sewer system which flows into Nassau County's system, which treats the sewage from the village's system through the Nassau County-owned sewage treatment plants.

 Water 
The Village of Mineola owns and maintains its own water system. Mineola's water system serves the entire village with water.

Notable people

 Lenny Bruce (1925–1966), comedian
 Jean Butler, (born 1971), Stepdancer, master of Irish Dance, choreographer, and actress. Known for Riverdance.
 Kenneth Chenault (born 1951), CEO of American Express
 Emmy Clarke (born 1991), actress who played the recurring character Julie Teeger on the USA Network show Monk.
 Brian Dennehy (1938-2020), actor
 Jack Emmer, all-time winningest Division I men's college lacrosse coach for Army
 Louis V. Gerstner, Jr., former Chairman of IBM and former Chairman of the Carlyle Group; born and raised in Mineola; attended Corpus Christi Grammar School and Chaminade High School
 Jimmy Hines (1903–1986), professional golfer
 Kevin James (born 1965), actor, comedian, star of films and television series The King of Queens Elliot G. Jaspin (born 1946), 1979 winner of the Pulitzer Prize for Investigative Reporting
 James Patrick Kelly (born 1951), Hugo Award-winning author
 B. J. LaMura (born 1981), professional baseball pitcher who played for Italy in the 2009 World Baseball Classic
Diane Macedo (born 1982), news anchor for ABC News
 Jackie Martling (born 1948), comedian and former writer for The Howard Stern Show 
 John Mateer (born 1995), recording artist and filmmaker
 Carlos Mendes (born 1980), defender for Major League Soccer side New York Red Bulls
 Bill Owens, former Congressman for New York's 23rd District; raised in Mineola; graduate of Chaminade High School
 Garrett Pilon (born 1998), son of former NHLer Rich Pilon, Garrett plays in the NHL for the Washington Capitals and Hershey Bears of the American Hockey League (AHL)
 Kim Richards (born 1964), child actress who starred in Nanny and the Professor, Escape to Witch Mountain, No Deposit, No Return, and Return from Witch Mountain Lauren Scala (born 1982), WNBC and New York Nonstop correspondent
 Robert B. Silvers (1929-2017), editor of The New York Review of BooksKatherine Teck (born 1939), author and composer
 Frances Townsend (born 1961), US Homeland Security Adviser under President George W. Bush
 John Valentin (born 1967), former MLB player
 Tiffany Vollmer (born 1973), voice actress best known for portraying Bulma from Dragon Ball''
 Chris Weidman (born 1984), UFC Middleweight Champion

References

External links

 Official website
 Mineola Chamber of Commerce

 
County seats in New York (state)
Villages in Nassau County, New York
Villages in New York (state)